Jett Woo (born July 27, 2000) is a Canadian professional ice hockey defenceman who currently plays for the Abbotsford Canucks of the American Hockey League (AHL), as a prospect of the Vancouver Canucks of the National Hockey League (NHL). On June 23, 2018, he was selected 37th overall in the 2018 NHL Entry Draft. He is of Chinese and German descent.

Playing career
During the 2018–19 season, his fourth season with the Moose Jaw Warriors, Woo was signed to a three-year, entry-level contract with the Vancouver Canucks on March 17, 2019.

At the 2019 WHL Bantam Draft on May 2, 2019, Woo was traded from Moose Jaw to the Calgary Hitmen in exchange for defenceman Vladislav Yeryomenko, forward Ryder Korczak, the 11th overall selection in the 2019 WHL Bantam Draft, and a second-round pick in 2021.

Career statistics

Regular season and playoffs

International

References

External links 

2000 births
Living people
Abbotsford Canucks players
Calgary Hitmen players
Canadian ice hockey defencemen
Canadian sportspeople of Chinese descent
Moose Jaw Warriors players
Utica Comets players
Vancouver Canucks draft picks
Ice hockey players at the 2016 Winter Youth Olympics
Youth Olympic silver medalists for Canada